Suzanne Mary Ellery (born 12 May 1962) is an Australian politician who has been a Labor Party member of the Legislative Council of Western Australia since 2001, representing South Metropolitan Region. She is the current Minister for Finance, Minister for Commerce, and Minister for Women's Interests in the McGowan government, having previously served as a minister in the government of Alan Carpenter from 2007 to 2008.

Early life
Ellery was born in Perth to Rosemarie (née Gellard) and Peter Ellery. She attended Newman College before going on to the University of Western Australia, graduating with a Bachelor of Arts degree. She joined the Labor Party while at university, and in 1983 was the national women's officer for the Australian Union of Students. Prior to entering politics, Ellery worked in the trade union movement, including as an industrial advocate for the Liquor, Hospitality, and Miscellaneous Workers' Union.

Politics
Ellery entered parliament at the 2001 state election, as the lead candidate on the Labor Party's ticket in South Metropolitan Region. She was a parliamentary secretary in the government of Geoff Gallop in 2003, and continued on when Alan Carpenter replaced Gallop as premier in January 2006. Ellery was elevated to the ministry in March 2007, becoming Minister for Child Protection, Minister for Community Services, Minister for Women's Interests, and Minister for Seniors and Volunteering. She held her positions until the Labor government's defeat at the 2008 state election. After that election, Ellery continued on as a shadow minister, and was also elected leader of the Labor Party in the Legislative Council. She has been identified as a member of the party's Labor Left faction.

From 2017 to 2022, she was the minister for education and training. In December 2022, she requested a change in ministries during a cabinet reshuffle. She became the minister for finance, minister for commerce, and minister for women's interests.

Ellery plans to retire from politics at the 2025 election.

See also
 Women in the Western Australian Legislative Council

References 

|-

1962 births
Living people
Women members of the Western Australian Legislative Council
Australian Labor Party members of the Parliament of Western Australia
Australian trade unionists
Members of the Western Australian Legislative Council
People educated at Newman College, Perth
Politicians from Perth, Western Australia
University of Western Australia alumni
21st-century Australian politicians
21st-century Australian women politicians
Labor Left politicians